Glen Allen is a census-designated place (CDP) in Henrico County, Virginia, United States. The population was 16,187 as of the 2020 Census, up from 14,774 at the 2010 census. Areas outside the CDP which use a "Glen Allen" mailing address include residences in neighboring Hanover County.

History
Called "Mountain Road Crossing" when rail service began in 1836, the settlement which came to be known as Glen Allen took its name from the homestead of a local landowner, Mrs. Benjamin Allen. Its most noted resident was Captain John Cussons, a native Englishman, Confederate scout, author, and entrepreneur. Cussons made his residence here after the Civil War and founded a successful printing company. Later he built a fashionable resort hotel known as Forest Lodge adjacent to the railroad tracks.

The area of Glen Allen used to be mostly rural farmland, but it is now a growing suburb of Richmond.

Geography

The CDP is bordered to the north by the Chickahominy River, which forms the Henrico–Hanover County line. The eastern border of the CDP is Interstate 95, from the Chickahominy River south to East Parham Road. The southern border of the CDP follows East Parham Road, U.S. Route 1, Virginia State Route 157 (Mountain Road), Jessie Chavis Drive, North Run, Woodman Road, Blackburn Road, Winston Boulevard, and Indale Road to the CSX railroad line, which it follows south to Hungary Road. The western border of the CDP follows Hungary Spring Road, Old Route 33, Attems Way, and U.S. Route 33 (Staples Mill Road) to Courtney Road, then follows a power line northeast back to the CSX rail line. The border follows the railroad north to County Road 625 (Greenwood Road), then takes Old Washington Highway to the Chickahominy River. Glen Allen uses two postal addresses, ZIP codes 23059 and 23060, which cover neighboring communities as well, including rural areas of Hanover County to the north.

The Glen Allen CDP includes all or portions of the communities of Hunton, Greenwood, Longdale, Holly Glen Estates, Biltmore, and Yellow Tavern.

Demographics

As of the census of 2000, there were 12,562 people, 5,131 households, and 3,504 families residing in the CDP. The population density was 1,420.1 people per square mile (548.0/km2). There were 5,297 housing units at an average density of 598.8/sq mi (231.1/km2). The racial makeup of the CDP was 74.9% White, 19.5% African American, 0.4% Native American, 3.2% Asian, 0.1% Pacific Islander, 0.8% from other races, and 1.2% from two or more races. Hispanic or Latino of any race were 1.7% of the population.

There were 5,121 households, out of which 33.5% had children under the age of 18 living with them, 55.0% were married couples living together, 10.6% had a female householder with no husband present, and 31.7% were non-families. 26.2% of all households were made up of individuals, and 5.6% had someone living alone who was 65 years of age or older. The average household size was 2.45 and the average family size was 2.98.

In the CDP, the population was spread out, with 24.8% under the age of 18, 7.0% from 18 to 24, 37.1% from 25 to 44, 22.8% from 45 to 64, and 8.3% who were 65 years of age or older. The median age was 35 years. For every 100 females, there were 90.2 males. For every 100 females age 18 and over, there were 86.1 males.

The median income for a household in the CDP was $55,205, and the median income for a family was $63,670. Males had a median income of $42,279 versus $31,073 for females. The per capita income for the CDP was $25,719. About 1.0% of families and 2.5% of the population were below the poverty line, including 2.8% of those under age 18 and 1.6% of those age 65 or over.

Awards
 A selection in Money Magazine's 2007 "Top 100 Places to Live"
 A selection in Money Magazine's 2009 "Top 100 Places to Live"

Economy
Appliance maker Hamilton Beach and insurer Markel are based in Glen Allen.

Notable residents

Gene Alley, former Major League Baseball shortstop
Dave Brat, former member of the U.S. House of Representatives from Virginia's 7th congressional district
Chris Durkin, soccer
Zac Jones, NHL hockey player for the New York Rangers
Andrew Knizner, baseball player for the St. Louis Cardinals
R. C. Orlan, baseball pitcher
Brian Ownby, soccer player
Abigail Spanberger, Congresswoman for Virginia's 7th congressional district

References

External links
 

Census-designated places in Virginia
Census-designated places in Henrico County, Virginia
Suburbs of Richmond, Virginia